is a Japanese singer, musician and songwriter.

Biography

Before major debut 
In 6th grade, Sayuri was impressed by the fact that, despite being idols, Kanjani Eight formed a band. They inspired her to take up guitar as a hobby. Sayuri began composing music during her second year of junior high school, aspiring to the lyrics and songwriting of Kanjani Eight.

Afterward, under the name Asuka, she joined an acoustic duo called LONGTAL based in Fukuoka, she started performing in the streets and live houses of places like Hiroshima, Osaka, and Nagoya. The name "Asuka" was derived from her Twitter account name "@taltalasuka". She was also the guitarist and vocalist of the band Muu. By this time, she had dropped out of high school.

In 2012, as part of LONGTAL, Sayuri was awarded the Grand Prix at the finals of the fifth Music Revolution, a competition sponsored by Yamaha Music, as the youngest contestant at 15. Afterwards, she became active as an indie artist. 

Sayuri moved to Tokyo in August 2013. Though she performed in live houses, she felt uncomfortable singing only for people who like music in a closed space, so she began performing on streets for various people.

After major debut

2015 
She held her first solo live in March 2015 at Tsutaya O-East in Tokyo. On August 26, she released her first single "Mikazuki", making her major debut at 18. The song was used as the ending theme for the Fuji TV anime Rampo Kitan: Game of Laplace, Mikazuki.

2016 
On February 24, she released her second single "It's like a small light". The song was used as the ending theme for the Fuji TV anime Erased. Yuki Kajiura, who was in charge of the music in the anime, composed and wrote the lyrics for the song.

On April 23, she held a one-man live "Mikazuki no Koukai" at the Shibuya WWW. Tickets were sold out within seconds after they went on sale, and an additional performance tour was held in Tokyo, Osaka, and Fukuoaka.

On June 24, she released her first single that wasn't an ending theme "Lu-La-La-Lu-La-Lu-La-La-Lu-La" as her third single for digital distribution only. The song was rearranged from an original self-produced song that previously won the Grand Prix in 2012. 

On December 7, she collaborated with Yojiro Noda of RADWIMPS to release her 4th single "Furaregai Girl." Concerning the single, Noda said, "I had already composed the song and created the lyrics, but I knew that I couldn't sing it. For a while, I searched for the true owner of the song. Then, by chance, I was in the recording studio next to Sayuri. I listened to her CD, and at that moment, something that was only a vague silhouette of a song became crystal clear. It was a song that she was meant to sing." The b-side "Anonymous" became a collaboration with the smartphone game "Shuutsu Toshi", and limited-time events such as live performance, listening to music in the game, and the appearance of Sayuri's character in game were decided.

2017 
On March 1, Sayuri released her fifth single "Parallel Line," which was featured as the ending song to the anime adaptation of Scum's Wish. It is her first drama ending song. 

On March 23, she announced the release of her first original album Mikazuki no Koukai. When the album was released on May 17, it reached first on Oricon's Daily Album Ranking and 3rd on its Weekly Album Ranking. This was a significant jump from her previous singles and a milestone in her career. 

On May 19, she held a street live in Shinjuku for the first time in over a year, where Sayuri used to perform on the street. Around 2000 fans attended.

On August 23, the full-length music video for "Jū-oku-nen", a song on Mikazuki no Koukai was released.

On November 24, Sayuri held her largest one-man live at Tokyo Dome City Hall.

2018 
She released her sixth single  on February 28; the song is used as the ending theme of anime Fate/Extra Last Encore. She performed at Anisong World Matsuri at Anime Expo July 6, 2018, in the United States. 

She collaborated with My First Story in performing the song  released on November 27; the song is used as the second opening theme of anime series Golden Kamuy.

2019 
Sayuri is featured on Hiroyuki Sawano's song "Me & Creed <nZkv>", which was supposed to be used as the theme song for the mobile game Blue Exorcist: Damned Chord under the name "SawanoHiroyuki[nZk]:Sayuri". However, in November 2020 it was announced that the game was cancelled.

On April 13, she announced on her Twitter that she had left Yamaha Music Entertainment Holdings on March 31.

On August 25, 2019, it was announced that she will perform the ending theme song for the anime My Hero Academia Season 4 with her song "Koukai no Uta" (The Song of the Voyage). This was her first single in around a year and a half under her name.

2020 
On May 16, it was announced that the new song "Aoibashi" would be used as the theme song for the anime Sing "Yesterday" for Me. It was used in seven episodes broadcast that same day and was released digitally on May 22. The name "Aoibashi" comes from "Aoibashi Station" from when the Keio line was running as a streetcare on the Koshu highway.

Her first solo album "Me" was released on June 3.

On August 1, she released a digital single summer bug.

On October 24, Sayuri announced that she would be signing with Aitoni Entertainment.

2022 
On July 3, the ending theme to the anime series Lycoris Recoil, was released.

On August 10, she released her second album Sanketsu-shoujo.

Personal life 
She adopted the name  which is symbolic of her calling herself a 2.5-dimensional parallel singer-songwriter. She usually performs barefoot and in a poncho.

She has a powerful voice that naturally trembles, and many of her songs have shadowy lyrics. Since she left Yamaha Music Entertainment Holdings in 2019, her songs with brighter tones have increased, suggesting a change in Sayuri's own feelings. It is said that 80% of her lyrics are based on actual experiences. 

Her real name has not been revealed. When delivering a TwiCast at her junior high school in Fukuoka, the name tag of the sailor suit she wore had her last name hidden, with Sayuri written in hiragana. Even after moving to Tokyo, she still uses the designated uniform of her junior high school.

Her favorite things include tomatoes, miso-simmered mackerel, steel towers, and boundaries.

She has stated that she is about 150cm tall, 40.3kg (as of 2015), with a shoe size of 21.5cm.

Though she dropped out of high school, she later tweeted that she took the high school certification exam.

She said that from 2014 to 2016, her street performances in places like Shinjuku were training for her.

Discography

Albums

Studio albums

Hikigatari albums

Singles

Collaboration single

Guest appearances

Music videos

Awards and nominations 
The following table lists out some of the most important awards received by the artist.

Notes

References

External links 
 
 
 
 

1996 births
Living people
People from Fukuoka
Japanese women pop singers
Japanese women singer-songwriters
Japanese singer-songwriters
21st-century Japanese singers
21st-century Japanese women singers